Cristina Martínez Bonafé (born 2 January 1996) is a Spanish professional racing cyclist, who currently rides for UCI Women's Continental Team .

Major results

2014
 National Junior Road Championships
1st  Road race
2nd Time trial
2015
 1st Young rider classification Emakumeen Euskal Bira
 5th Overall Vuelta a Burgos Feminas
2016
 10th Overall Vuelta a Burgos Feminas
2017
 1st  Valencian rider classification Setmana Ciclista Valenciana
 2nd Scratch, Trofeu Internacional Ciutat de Barcelona
2019
 10th Overall Emakumeen Euskal Bira

See also
 List of 2015 UCI Women's Teams and riders

References

External links
 

1996 births
Living people
Spanish female cyclists
Cyclists from the Valencian Community
People from Torrent, Valencia
Sportspeople from the Province of Valencia